An Everlasting Piece is a 2000 American comedy film directed by Barry Levinson, written by and starring Barry McEvoy. The plot involves two wig salesmen, one Catholic and one Protestant, who live in war-torn Belfast, Northern Ireland, in the mid-1980s. The supporting cast includes comedian Billy Connolly as an patient in a psychiatric hospital. McEvoy based the screenplay on the adventures of his father as a toupée peddler to both sides in the midst of the conflict.  The movie was shot on location in both Belfast and Dublin.

Plot
Colm takes a job as a barber in a Belfast psychiatric hospital. He meets the staff and is warned against talking about poetry with George, a fellow barber. When he brings it up, George subjects him to his own poor work, but the pair chat anyway. Later, they meet an orderly escorting a new patient, whom he refers to as "The Scalper", described as the only seller of hair pieces in all of Northern Ireland until he had a nervous breakdown and scalped some of his own customers. Colm and George decide to meet with the Scalper to gain his list of customers; they intend to take over his former hairpiece monopoly. The Scalper agrees to give them the list.

Colm and George, calling themselves "The Piece People", embark on their plan to get rich. Colm's girlfriend Bronagh helps. She sets up their first appointment with a Mr Black, who eventually agrees to buy a hairpiece, although he denies having been a customer of "The Scalper". Bronagh had seen his picture in the newspaper (featured after he shot a Catholic) and, as he was bald, thought he'd be a good prospect. Having little success in sales, Colm and George discover they have competition from "Toupée or not Toupée", rivals who also acquired the client list. The supplier, "Wigs Of Wimbledon", decides to hold a meeting with two companies to inform them that the one who sells the most in a given time period will win an exclusive rights for all of Northern Ireland. The partners visit a farmer but lose the sale, learning that their competitors are underselling them. On a remote road, they are stopped by members of the Irish Republican Army (IRA), demanding to know what they are up to. This confrontation results in the partners selling a wig to the lead IRA man, who fails to notice it had been chewed by dogs.

The competition is raging, but the IRA man accidentally leaves the unique wig at the scene of a bombing. The Royal Ulster Constabulary (RUC) trace it to The Piece People. After being interrogated, George and Colm have a falling-out. Meanwhile, the IRA man who lost the wig tracks Colm down and demands Colm sell him his whole inventory because now every bald Catholic in Northern Ireland is a potential suspect for the police. Colm refuses as his business partner is a Protestant and thinks it would be unethical to protect the IRA because the sales would likely help The Piece People win the exclusive deal with Wigs Of Wimbledon.

Colm goes to a poetry reading by George, and the two make peace. With the help of Bronagh, the duo learn that many British Army soldiers in Northern Ireland are suffering from alopecia (hair loss) due to the stressful conditions, and secure a government contract to supply wigs to all soldiers who want them. With this, they win the competition and gain the rights to Northern Ireland.

Cast
 Barry McEvoy as Colm
 Brían F. O'Byrne as George
 Anna Friel as Bronagh
 Pauline McLynn as Gerty
 Laurence Kinlan as Mickey
 Billy Connolly as Scalper
 Enda Oates as Detective

Lawsuit against DreamWorks
In 2001, one of the film's producers, Jerome O'Connor, filed a $10 million lawsuit in federal court in Manhattan against Steven Spielberg's studio DreamWorks, the film's distributor. He complained that, although his film had received favorable reviews, the studio had reduced distribution from a projected 800 to eight theaters in the United States, and then pulled it from distribution. O'Connor alleged the film was "sabotaged" because director Barry Levinson would not change scenes to please British officials in its Foreign Office, which objected to its "sympathetic portrayal" of the IRA. O'Connor claimed DreamWorks officials feared the film might interfere with Steven Spielberg's attaining an honorary knighthood (which Spielberg received in January 2001).

O'Connor argued that then Prime Minister Tony Blair had arranged for a loan of military equipment and 2,000 troops to Spielberg's production of Band of Brothers (TV miniseries), which aired in 2001 on HBO, and that Spielberg gave Blair's son Euan a job in the production, indicating a quid pro quo. A DreamWorks spokesman said the studio had not requested any film cuts. An Everlasting Piece was released on DVD, and the film, which had a $14,000,000 budget, earned $75,228.

A decade after filing his lawsuit, a New York judge dismissed it in February 2011. O'Connor's counsel reserved the right to file an appeal, but ultimately did not file one.

Reception
An Everlasting Piece received mixed reviews from critics and holds a 48% rating on Rotten Tomatoes based on 43 reviews. The site's consensus states: "This comedy is too slight to leave an impression, and its attempts at whimsy are not as funny as they could have been."

References

External links

DVD Verdict: An Everlasting Piece

2000 films
2000 comedy films
American comedy films
Films about The Troubles (Northern Ireland)
Films set in Belfast
Films set in Northern Ireland
Films directed by Barry Levinson
Films scored by Hans Zimmer
DreamWorks Pictures films
Columbia Pictures films
2000s English-language films
2000s American films